Șura Mică is a commune in the central part of Sibiu County, Transylvania, Romania. The commune is located immediately to the north of the city of Sibiu. It is composed of two villages, Rusciori (Reußdörfchen; Oroszcsűr) and Șura Mică.

Population
1525: a school
1786: 613 people
1910: 1412 people
1990: 2550 people

History
The village was documented in 1323 as "Parvum Horreum" = Kleine Scheuer.

A medieval fortified church in Șura Mică was built in the 13th century and considerably rebuilt around 1500. Only fragments of the surrounding wall survive.

The village is known for the colorful "Trachten" of the traditional Saxon population dress for women and girls.

Agricultural centre: farming, livestock, hops, fruits.

Name changes: Cleynschowern (ca. 1468).

References

Communes in Sibiu County
Localities in Transylvania